Target 3 Billion is a book by the former President of India, A. P. J. Abdul Kalam, and Srijan Pal Singh. The book highlights the issues prevailing in rural India and suggests measures to improve standards of living. It focuses on the inclusive development project called PURA (Providing Urban Amenities in Rural Areas). The book plans to improve the standard of living amongst the poor rural population through voluntary campaigns such as community's participation and entrepreneurship.

It cites the work of Fabio Rosa who helped in changing the structure of Palmares, a rural district in Brazil, by rural electrification. The access to water and electricity and better agricultural methods had led to prosperity in the region. Further, it describes Magarpatta, the organisation of Magarpatta city, which now provides home to over 35,000 people and the development of an IT park.

Synopsis by chapter
Each chapter has a topic that consists of a set of essays on different aspects of that main topic:

The 'Other' Half of Mankind 
 The Changing World and Its Connectedness
 Bridging the Gap Between Yesterday's Methods and the Problems of the Future
 The Disparity is Global
 The Rise of the New Village
 India as a Focal Examples

Sustaining the Growth Trajectory 
 A Vision of India in 2020
 Integrated Action for a Developed India
 India in 2011
 What is Needed
 A Review of 'Urbanization'
 The Path Ahead
 Rural India: Opportunity and Challenge

Sustainable Development Systems and PURA 

 Sustainable Development
 Sustainable Development and Peaceful Societies
 Constituents of Sustainable Development
 The Evolution of a Sustainable Development System in India
 What is PURA
 Classification of PURA
 Moving Ahead on PURA

Agriculture and PURA 
 The Relevance of Agriculture
 The Indian Agriculture Sector: The Farm
 Interaction With Farmers at Rashtrapati Bhavan
 What Targets Should Sustainable PURA Have?
 Taking Technology to the Fields
 Loni PURA
 Live Demonstration Farms in Chitrakoot PURA
 Seeds Clubs at Chitrakoot PURA
 Warana Cooperative Sugar Factory
 The First Green Revolution
 Agriculture Reforms in the State of Gujarat
 Low Water Efficiency in Agriculture
 Advanced Research and Development and Market Management in Agriculture
 National Milk Vision of India
 Processing and Marketing
 World Trade
 Launch of National Milk Vision
 The Fishing Industry in the Country
 Challenges for the Indian Fisheries Sector
 Towards India's Second Green Revolution
 The Low Vision
 Developed India

Effecting a Social Transformation 
 A Need for Societal Focus
 The Gap in Rural-Urban Amenities
 The Linkage Between Economic and Social Assets
 India's Current Ambience: Creating Societal Amenities
 Creating a Society Based on Knowledge and Skills
 Challenges in Health Care at the Rural Level
 Creating an Outcome-Oriented Approach and an Integrated Problem-Solving Outlook
 A New Generation of Social Enrepreneurs
 Creating a Value-Based Society
 Achieving an Integrated Health Mission for the Loni PURA Complex
 Bringing Quality Goods to PURA Through Cooperative Supermarkets
 Meenakshi Mission PURA
 Advant of New Socio-Economic Tools

References

External links
 

2011 non-fiction books
Books about the economy of India
Indian non-fiction books
A. P. J. Abdul Kalam
21st-century Indian books
Penguin Books India books